Chad Ryan William Posthumus (born February 12, 1991) is a Canadian professional basketball player for the Winnipeg Sea Bears of the Canadian Elite Basketball League (CEBL). He played college basketball with UBC, Howard College, and Morehead State. Following his collegiate career, Chad played with the Chicago Bulls in the NBA Summer League before continuing his professional basketball career with various organizations in Asia, South and North America.

High school career
Posthumus attended River East Collegiate, a high school located in Winnipeg, Manitoba in Canada. He was considered one of the top high school basketball players in the country as a senior, averaging 39 points, 25 rebounds, and 7 blocks. His career-high with River East was a 69-point performance. Through his high school years, Posthumus led his team to two provincial quarterfinals and was named a provincial All-Star in his final two seasons with the Kodiaks.

Collegiate career
Posthumus played with the Thunderbirds of the University of British Columbia for his freshman college basketball season. In a total of 16 games played, he averaged 1.7 points and 2.8 rebounds. Nevertheless, his team finished the season with a 25–3 record and put together a 13-game winning streak as well. Posthumus did not play basketball in his true sophomore season as a redshirt and would end up transferring to Howard College in Big Spring, Texas in the United States the following year. At Howard, the center appeared in 24 contest and averaged 4.0 points and 3.2 rebounds. He shot .570 on field goals and .690 from the free throw line. The Hawks finished the season with a 23–8 record. Posthumus then transferred to Morehead State, in NCAA Division I as a redshirt junior. He played in all 33 of the Eagles' games and averaged 7.5 points and 6.8 rebounds. Posthumus also recorded two double-doubles and had career-highs of 19 points and 19 rebounds against Oakland and SIU Edwardsville respectively. Posthumus returned to Morehead State for his final college season and averaged 9.6 points off 51% shooting along with 10.9 rebounds per game which was the second-highest in the nation. He also posted 10 double-doubles and following the season Posthumus earned College Sports Madness All-Ohio Valley Conference (OVC) honors and gained fame back in Canada.

Professional career
Over the summer after his graduation, Posthumus signed with Chicago Bulls and participated in the NBA Summer League. On August 1, 2014, Posthumus signed his first professional contract with Levanga Hokkaido of the Japan Basketball League (JBL). Posthumus made his pro debut on October 11, 2014, against the Mitsubishi Diamond Dolphins, scoring 16 points and posting 13 rebounds. On November 23 and 24, in games vs the Tsukuba Robots, he recorded back-to-back double-doubles, grabbing a season-high 15 rebounds in the first contest. He finished his stint with the Japanese team averaging 10.1 points and 8.1 rebounds in 23 minutes per game.

On January 9, 2015, Posthumus inked with the Mississauga Power of the National Basketball League of Canada (NBL). He debuted with the Power by scoring 34 points and posting 22 rebounds. In all three of his games, Posthumus put up double-doubles, but he failed to lead his team to any wins.

On January 22, 2015, Posthumus signed with Argentino de Junín of the Liga Nacional de Básquet in Argentina for the remainder of the season where he averaged 9.7 points and 4.9 boards.

On September 3, 2015, he signed with the London Lightning and made a return to the NBL Canada. He would play under former Power head coach Kyle Julius, who left the Power after the organization folded. On February 27, he was acquired by the Island Storm in exchange for the rights to Nick Evans. 

Posthumus signed with the Saskatchewan Rattlers of the CEBL in 2019. He averaged 5.2 points and 4.6 rebounds per game. Posthumus re-joined the team the following year In August of 2021, he signed with the Ottawa Blackjacks and became the first player in CEBL history to record a 20/20 when he recorded 23 points and 20 rebounds in Ottawa's CEBL quarter-final victory over the Hamilton Honey Badgers on August 14. Posthumus joined the Edmonton Stingers for the 2021–22 BCL Americas. On February 16, he re-signed with the Ottawa BlackJacks for the 2022 season. On March 2, 2023, the Winnipeg Sea Bears announced Posthumus as their first ever signing for their inaugural season.

Personal life
Chad was diagnosed with Type 1 Diabetes at the age of 7. He is an advocate of incorporating sport and a healthy lifestyle into the management of Diabetes.

As a redshirt sophomore, while attending Howard College, Posthumus was named an Academic All-American and a member of the Dean's List. He also earned a 4.0 grade point average (GPA).

Chad finished his undergraduate schooling with Science and University Studies degree’s, and went on to complete postgraduate studies, attaining a Master Of Business Administration degree.

References

External links
Morehead State Eagles bio

1991 births
Living people
Argentino de Junín basketball players
Basketball players from Winnipeg
Canadian expatriate basketball people in the United States
Canadian men's basketball players
Centers (basketball)
Edmonton Stingers players
Howard Hawks men's basketball players
Island Storm players
Kagoshima Rebnise players
Levanga Hokkaido players
London Lightning players
Mississauga Power players
Morehead State Eagles men's basketball players
Ottawa Blackjacks players
Saskatchewan Rattlers players
Shinshu Brave Warriors players
Sun Rockers Shibuya players
UBC Thunderbirds basketball players